Hokuto Konishi (born July 11, 1984), also known as Hok, is a Japanese breakdancer, choreographer, actor, and television personality. Konishi member of the American hip-hop dance crew Quest Crew and was a finalist on the third season of the American reality television show So You Think You Can Dance.

His Season 3 performance on So You Think You Can Dance – Hummingbird and Flower choreographed by Wade Robson won the Primetime Emmy Award for Outstanding Choreography in 2008.
He was a student in graphic design at Santa Monica College.
Hok also was seen in Alvin and the Chipmunks: The Squeakquel as a hip-hop dancer participating in a music competition.  He is the choreographer of LMFAO's "Party Rock Anthem" and "Champagne Showers" music videos.

Konishi is one of the judges on the CBS talent competition The World's Best representing the country of Japan.

So You Think You Can Dance 
Konishi is a breakdancer and has also appeared on So You Think You Can Dance in seasons one, two, and three. In season two Konishi nearly made it to the final twenty, but with only a student visa, he was unable to be legally employed in the United States, which resulted in his dismissal from the program. Subsequently, he obtained a work permit and became eligible to participate in the competition in Season Three.  He was voted off the show by the judges on July 19, 2007.

Konishi is known for his breakdancing moves and was formerly a member of the dance troupe SickStep. He appeared with SickStep in the season two auditions and was the final member to make it through to the Vegas stage. As of 2007, he is a member of a breaking crew called Quest Crew, which competes and performs in various venues in California.

Personal life 
Born in Tokyo, Konishi is of Japanese descent, but grew up in Oxford, England. He is a graduate in graphic design at Santa Monica College. 

Konishi married hair stylist Gina Atkinson in 2022. Konishi is friends with So You Think You Can Dance season one contestant Ryan Conferido; they are both members of Quest.

References

Living people
1984 births
Japanese expatriates in the United States
So You Think You Can Dance (American TV series) contestants
Hip hop dancers
21st-century American dancers
American breakdancers